Colonia Ulpia Traiana Augusta Dacica Sarmizegetusa was the capital and the largest city of Roman Dacia, later named Ulpia Traiana Sarmizegetusa after the former Dacian capital, located some 40 km away. Built on the ground of a camp of the Fifth Macedonian Legion, the city was settled by veterans of the Dacian wars. From the very beginning it received the title of colonia and the status of ius Italicum.

The city was destroyed by the Goths. Today Ulpia Traiana remains in ruins, with a partly preserved forum, an amphitheatre, and remnants of several temples.

History

The exact period when the city was built is not known. Some say the first settlement was erected between 106-107, others say it was between 108-110. However, due to an inscription discovered at the beginning of the 14th century in the village of Grădişte, it is known that the new town was settled in the first years after the conquest of Dacia. The inscription reads: "On the command of the emperor Caesar Nerva Traianus Augustus, son of the divine Nerva, was settled the Dacian Colony by Decimus Terentius Scaurianus, its governor."

In Rome, the settlement of the colony was marked by the minting of a coin, by order of the Senate, dedicated to emperor Trajan.

During the reign of Hadrian the city was renamed Colonia Ulpia Traiana Augusta Dacica Sarmizegetusa. Between 222 and 235 the colony was called a metropolis. The name was found on a stone inscription that reads "To Gaius Arrius Quadratus, son of Gaius, acting praetor of the emperor in Colonia Ulpia Traiana Augusta Dacica Sarmizegetusa." Gaius Arrius Antoninus bore the title legatus pro praetore, which was the official title of the governor of some imperial provinces of the Roman Empire.

Location
The settlement was built at a distance of 8 km from Tapae, a pass between Banat and Transylvania (today known as the Iron Gates of Transylvania). The choice was based on the military and economic advantages given by the natural barrier represented by the Retezat Mountains in the south and Poiana Ruscă Mountains in the north. The territory of the metropolis extended from Tibiscum to Micia and to the Jiu canyon, the city being protected by several castra: Tibiscum, Pons Augusti, Micia and castra of Bumbești.

The city was crossed by the imperial road from the Danube that linked the north of the province with Porolissum (Moigrad).

Archeological site
Today, the archeological site contains the following remains:
 Amphitheatre
 Gladiator school
 Goddess Nemesis Temple
 Liber Pater Temple
 Gods Aesculapius and Hygieia Temple
 Temple Basilica
 Temple of god Mithra
 Temple of palmyrans
 Great Temple
 God Silvanus Temple
 Glass blowers' workshops
 Horreum
 Financial procurator's office
 Thermae
 Forum

Image gallery

See also
List of castra

Notes

External links

 ULPIA TRAIANA SARMIZEGETUSA
 ULPIA TRAIANA SARMIZEGETUSA

Archaeological sites in Romania
Former populated places in Romania
Roman towns and cities in Romania
Tourist attractions in Hunedoara County
Historic monuments in Hunedoara County
Ancient history of Transylvania
Trajan